OpenELEC (short for Open Embedded Linux Entertainment Center) is a discontinued Linux distribution designed for home theater PCs and based on the Kodi (formerly XBMC) media player.

OpenELEC applies the "just enough operating system" principle. It is designed to consume relatively few resources and to boot quickly from flash memory. OpenELEC disk images for the Raspberry Pi series and Freescale i.MX6 based devices are also available.

The OpenELEC team released OpenELEC 4.0 on 5 May 2014, and this version features updated XBMC 13.0 with further updated important parts of the operating system as well as the Linux kernel updated to version 3.14 and additional device drivers. OpenELEC 4.0 also switched its init system to systemd.

In March 2016, OpenELEC was forked after "creative differences", taking most of its active developers at the time to join the new LibreELEC project.

Description 
OpenELEC provides a complete media center software suite that comes with a pre-configured version of Kodi and third-party addons with retro video game console emulators and DVR plugins. OpenELEC is an extremely small and very fast-booting Linux based distribution, primarily designed to boot from flash memory card such as CompactFlash or a solid-state drive, similar to that of the XBMCbuntu (formerly XBMC Live) distribution but specifically targeted to a minimum set-top box hardware setup based on an ARM SoCs or Intel x86 processor and graphics.

History 
Since 2011, the OpenELEC team usually releases a new major version, following the Kodi release schedule.

Since 2014, specifics builds supporting a set of Graphics/GPU chipsets (ION, Fusion, Intel,...) are deprecated. And since version 6, x86 builds are deprecated too. Builds are currently available for x86-64 systems (as "Generic Build"), Raspberry Pi, Raspberry Pi 2, Raspberry Pi 3 and the first generation Apple TV.

Systems 
On 5 February 2013, OpenELEC announced that they had jointly developed, with Arctic, a manufacturer of computer cooling systems based in Switzerland, a passively cooled entertainment system – the MC001 media centre, based on the Kodi 12 (OpenELEC 3.0) platform.  They also announced plans to provide further builds for the ARCTIC MC001 systems on their next release.

Pulse-Eight sells both custom and off the shelf hardware products primarily designed for Kodi, such as remote controls, HTPC systems and accessories, including a HTPC PVR set-top-box pre-installed with Kodi that they call "PulseBox" Pulse-Eight also offers free performance tuned embedded versions of Kodi that they call Pulse, which is based on OpenELEC and a custom PVR-build of Kodi meant to run on dedicated HTPC systems.

Xtreamer Ultra and Xtreamer Ultra 2, manufactured by the South Korean company Unicorn Information Systems, are nettops based on Nvidia graphics and Intel Atom processors and pre-installed OpenELEC and Kodi software. The first-generation Xtreamer Ultra uses Nvidia Ion chipset with a 1.80 GHz Dual-Core Intel Atom D525 CPU, while the Xtreamer Ultra 2 uses discrete GeForce GT 520M graphics with a 2.13 GHz Dual-Core Intel Atom D2700 CPU.

Receptions 
Dedoimedo reviewed openELEC in 2014:

Nathan Willis from LWN.net wrote review of OpenELEC 5 in 2015:

One of DistroWatch Weekly editors, Jesse Smith, wrote in review of OpenELEC 5.0.8 in 2015:

See also 

 LibreELEC
 Comparison of video player software
 Comparison of PVR software packages

References

External links 
 

ARM operating systems
Digital video recorders
Embedded Linux distributions
Free media players
Free mobile software
Linux-based devices
Mobile Linux
Mobile operating systems
Multimedia software
Satellite television
Television technology
Linux distributions